The Dingley Act of 1897 (ch. 11, July 24, 1897), introduced by U.S. Representative Nelson Dingley Jr., of Maine, raised tariffs in United States to counteract the Wilson–Gorman Tariff Act of 1894, which had lowered rates. The bill came into effect under William McKinley the first year that he was in office. The McKinley administration wanted to bring back the protectionism slowly that was proposed by the Tariff of 1890.

Following the election of 1896, McKinley followed through with his promises for protectionism. Congress imposed duties on wool and hides which had been duty-free since 1872. Rates were increased on woollens, linens, silks, china, and sugar (the tax rates for which doubled).  The Dingley Tariff remained in effect for twelve years, making it the longest-lasting tariff in U.S. history. It was also the highest in US history, averaging about 52% in its first year of operation. Over the life of the tariff, the rate averaged at around 47%.

The Dingley Act remained in effect until the Payne–Aldrich Tariff Act of 1909.

See also
 McKinley Tariff

Notes

Further reading
 F. W. Taussig. "The Tariff Act of 1897" Quarterly Journal of Economics Vol. 12, No. 1 (Oct., 1897), pp. 42–69  in JSTOR
 Taussig, Frank. Tariff History of the United States (1910) online

1897 in American law
United States federal taxation legislation
United States federal trade legislation
July 1897 events